Joseph DeSa (July 27, 1959 – December 20, 1986) was a Major League Baseball first baseman.

Drafted by the St. Louis Cardinals in the 3rd round of the 1977 MLB amateur draft, DeSa made his Major League Baseball debut with the St. Louis Cardinals on September 6, 1980, and appeared in his final game on October 3, 1985 for the Chicago White Sox.

DeSa died in an automobile accident in the early morning hours of December 20, 1986 in Cayey, Puerto Rico. At the time of his death, he was playing in the Puerto Rico Professional Baseball League for the Ponce Lions.

See also
 List of baseball players who died during their careers

External links
, or Retrosheet, or SABR Biography Project, or  Pelota Binaria (Venezuelan Winter League)

1959 births
1986 deaths
Arkansas Travelers players
Baseball players from Honolulu
Buffalo Bisons (minor league) players
Calgary Cardinals players
Cardenales de Lara players
American expatriate baseball players in Venezuela
Chicago White Sox players
Damien Memorial School alumni
Denver Zephyrs players
Gastonia Cardinals players
Leones de Ponce players
Louisville Redbirds players
Major League Baseball first basemen
Native Hawaiian sportspeople
Road incident deaths in Puerto Rico
Springfield Redbirds players
St. Louis Cardinals players